Jesús Ochoa may refer to:

 Jesús Ochoa (actor) (born 1959), Mexican actor
 Jesús Ochoa (footballer) (born 1981), Mexican soccer player